Helen de Guerry Simpson (1 December 1897 – 14 October 1940) was an Australian novelist and British Liberal Party politician.

Youth and education 
Simpson was born in Sydney into a family that had been settled in New South Wales for over 100 years. Her great-grandfather, Piers Simpson, R.N., was associated with Sir Thomas Mitchell and her maternal grandfather, the Marquis de Lauret, settled at Goulburn some 50 years before her birth. Her father, Edward Percy Simpson, was a well-known solicitor at Sydney who married Anne de Lauret. Helen Simpson was educated at the Convent of the Sacred Heart, Rose Bay (now called Kincoppal-Rose Bay, School of the Sacred Heart) and at Abbotsleigh, Wahroonga and, in 1914, she went to France for further study. On returning to England  she went to Oxford, reading French (1916-1917), at a time when women could study at Oxford but not receive degrees. in April 1918, she joined the WRNS to work in decoding as a senior section officer. In September 1919 she returned to Oxford to study music, and there became intensely interested in theatre, founding the Oxford Women's Dramatic Society and writing and publishing several plays. She was sent down in 1921 without completing her degree, apparently for breaking regulations prohibiting men and women students from acting together.

Career as a writer 
Her first appearance in print was a slight volume of verse, Philosophies in Little, published at Sydney in a limited edition in 1921. It attracted little notice but was included by Percival Serle in his list of the more important volumes in his Bibliography of Australasian Poetry and Verse, published in 1925. Her play, A Man of His Time, based on the life of Benvenuto Cellini and written partly in blank verse, was performed by McMahon's repertory company at Sydney and published there by Angus & Robertson in 1923. Her first novel, Acquittal, appeared in London in 1925 and was followed by The Baseless Fabric (short stories) in 1925 and Cups, Wands and Swords (1927). The Women's Comedy (a play) was privately printed in 1926.

Simpson visited Australia in 1927 and, in the same year, married Denis John Browne, F.R.C.S., a children's surgeon and a fellow Australian; Browne was a nephew of Thomas Alexander Browne, "Rolf Boldrewood". Mumbudget, a collection of Irish fairy stories, appeared in 1928 and was serialised on the BBC the following year. It was followed by The Desolate House (1929) and Vantage Striker (1931). These books were all capably written, but had comparatively little success.

She was a member of the Detection Club and contributed to two of their round-robin works The Floating Admiral (1931) and Ask a Policeman (1933) and the creative non-fiction The Anatomy of Murder (1936).

Boomerang, published in 1932, was her first big success. Its plot begins in Paris at the end of the eighteenth century, wanders all over the world, including Australia, and ends in the trenches in France during World War I. It was awarded the James Tait Black Memorial Prize for fiction and serialised for radio by William Power in 1937. It was followed by The Woman on the Beast in 1933, which consisted of a prologue, three books and an epilogue. The three books have no connection with each other; in reality they form three separate short novels with the common basis that the most hateful things may be done for apparently the best of reasons. An historical novel, Saraband for Dead Lovers (filmed in 1948) came out in 1935, as did The Female Felon, a long short story.

Simpson was also the author of two pieces of historical biography, The Spanish Marriage (1933) and Henry VIII (1934). The Happy Housewife, a book of household management, was published in 1934. The Waiting City, which appeared in 1933, is her translation of a selection from Louis-Sébastien Mercier's Le Tableau de Paris. Three novels, Enter Sir John (1929), Printer's Devil (1930) and Re-enter Sir John (1932), were written in conjunction with Clemence Dane. Enter Sir John was filmed as Murder! (1930) directed by Alfred Hitchcock, who later directed the film version of Under Capricorn (1949). Helen Simpson also wrote portions of the dialogue for Hitchcock's movie Sabotage (1936).

In 1937 Simpson went to Australia under engagement to the Australian Broadcasting Commission. She gave a series of lectures and, while in Australia, collected material for the novel Under Capricorn, which appeared in 1937 and was set in Sydney about 100 years earlier. In 1938, she published A Woman Among Wild Men, an account of Mary Kingsley. This was later published in 1950 as a Puffin Story Book under the title A Woman Among Savages.

Political career 
In 1939 she was selected by the Isle of Wight Liberal Association to be their parliamentary candidate at the UK General Election which was expected to take place in 1939 or 1940. The seat was held by the Conservatives but the Liberals were expected to challenge strongly to recapture the seat they last won in 1923. She attended the Liberal Party Assembly at Scarborough in June 1939 and travelled around England speaking for the Liberal Party.

Personal
She became ill and underwent a surgical operation in 1940, but died from cancer after months of suffering on 14 October 1940. Her husband, Sir Denis Browne, survived her with their daughter Clemence, who was named after Simpson's collaborator Clemence Dane. Simpson's last novel, Maid No More, was published in 1940.

Bibliography

Novels

 Acquittal (1925)
 Cups, Wands and Swords (1927)
 Enter Sir John (1929), with Clemence Dane. Serialised in Nash's Magazine in 1928
 The Desolate House (1929)
 Printer's Devil (1930), with Clemence Dane. Also known as Author Unknown
 Vantage Striker (1931)
 Boomerang (1932). Winner of the James Tait Black Memorial Prize for the Best Novel Published in 1932
 Re-enter Sir John (1932), with Clemence Dane 
 The Woman on the Beast: Viewed from Three Angles (1933)
Ask A Policeman (1933), with members of The Detection Club (Anthony Berkeley, Milward Kennedy, Gladys Mitchell, John Rhode, Dorothy L. Sayers and Simpson each contributed a chapter)
 Saraband for Dead Lovers (1935)
 Under Capricorn (1937)
 Maid No More (1940)

Collections

 Philosophies in Little (1921) original verse and translations
 The Baseless Fabric (1925) 11 short stories
 Mumbudget (1928) 6 short fairy stories for children
 Heartsease and Honesty: Being the Pastimes of the Sieur de Grammont (1935). Translation from the French

Biographies

 The Spanish Marriage, 1554 (1933)
 Henry VIII (1934)

Non-fiction
 The Waiting City: Paris 1782-1788 (1933), an abridged translation of Le Tableau de Paris by Louis-Sebastien Mercier
 Has Russia Hoaxed the Worker?. Billings Gazette, 15 January 1933
 What Communism Does to Women. Los Angeles Times, 29 January 1933
 The Happy Housewife (1934)
 The Witch Unbound. Collected in The Boat Train (1934), edited by Mary Agnes Hamilton
 What's Wrong with Our Hospitals?. Time and Tide, 1934
 The Female Felon (1935)
Death of Henry Kinder (1936), included in The Anatomy of Murder by The Detection Club

Drama

 A Man of His Time (1923)
 Pan in Pimlico, collected in Four One Act Plays, edited by AP Herbert (1923)
 The Women's Comedy (1926), a translation of L'ecole des Femmes by Moliere
 Gooseberry Fool (1929), with Clemence Dane
 Oxford Preserved (1930), with music by Richard Addinsell

Short fiction
 [Title unknown]. Nash's Magazine, December 1928
 My Daughter's Daughter. Sphere, 1 December 1929
 London in June. Sphere, 14 June 1930
 Death Versus Debt. Broadcast as a reading by Simpson. BBC National Service, 29 June 1934
 Puss in Boots. Collected in The Fairies Return (1934)
 No Jewel Is Like Rosalind (1938). Broadcast as a reading by Simpson on the BBC (1938)

References

Sources

Further reading

External links
Helen de Guerry Simpson at Getty Images
Works by  Helen Simpson at Project Gutenberg Australia
 

1897 births
1940 deaths
20th-century Australian novelists
20th-century Australian women writers
Australian people of French descent
Australian women novelists
Deaths from cancer in England
James Tait Black Memorial Prize recipients
Liberal Party (UK) parliamentary candidates
Members of the Detection Club
People educated at Abbotsleigh
Writers from Sydney